Etohexadiol (or ethohexadiol) is an ectoparasiticide. It was known as the insect repellent "6-12" (Six-twelve), or Rutgers 612. Its use in the U.S. was halted in 1991 after it was shown to cause developmental defects in animals.

References

Alkanediols
Insect repellents